Yakeen (Translation: Trust) is a 2005 Indian Hindi language romantic mystery thriller film directed by Girish Dhamija, starring Arjun Rampal, Priyanka Chopra in the lead roles while Kim Sharma, Sudhanshu Pandey and Saurabh Shukla are featured in supporting roles. The film's screenplay was written by Vikram Bhatt. The film's plot is loosely inspired by the 1991 Hollywood film Shattered. The film's premise centres on a man who recovers from an accident with amnesia, and as he starts to piece together his former life he feels that something is wrong.

Plot 

The film begins with the recovery of Simar (Priyanka Chopra) and her husband Nikhil (Arjun Rampal) from a car accident. Simar comes out unscathed while Nikhil suffers most of the physical damage along with psychogenic amnesia. Simar is determined he will heal and resume his life, and brings in the best surgeons to reconstruct his damaged leg and face, and helps him with his physical therapy.

Although Nikhil is at first cautious, Simar's love and dedication wins him over. After six months of therapy, he is released from the hospital and the couple return home. However, when Nikhil meets up with his old friends and goes through his personal files, he finds evidence that all was not well in his previous life. Now uncertain of his wife's true motives, he starts retracing his steps from the night of the accident, meeting with his friend Tanya (Kim Sharma) who tells him that on the night of the accident, he had planned to divorce Simar for infidelity.

Nikhil hires a private investigator named Chamanlal who discovers that the accusation is true: Simar had been having an affair with a man named "Kabir." Nikhil secretly overhears Simar talking on the phone with Kabir, in which she insists their relationship is over because she has fallen back in love with Nikhil. She agrees to meet Kabir one last time. Nikhil follows Simar to a secluded house, where he witnesses an argument between Simar and Kabir. After a chase through the woods, it is revealed that Simar staged the entire thing: Kabir was never on the phone nor in the house because he has been dead the entire time. Simar confesses that on the night of the accident, Nikhil had found Simar and Kabir together, and in his rage, he killed Kabir. Simar wanted to protect Nikhil from the guilt and believed his amnesia had been a chance to start their relationship anew. Nikhil believes this and reconciles with Simar.

Tanya contacts Nikhil with new information but he finds her shot dead. He informs Chamanlal that he has been having vivid flashbacks to the night of the accident, and has an idea where Kabir was buried. They drive out and dig up the body, which has been preserved in the snow. The corpse's face is exactly the same as Nikhil's.

"Nikhil" realises that he is in fact Kabir, and had been the one having an affair with Simar. It is revealed that the real Nikhil was emotionally abusive toward Simar. Kabir saw Simar being abandoned by Nikhil at a party one night and they began their affair, but after a while, Simar became too obsessed with him. On the night of the accident, Kabir had been trying to leave Simar, who threatened to commit suicide if he did. Nikhil had arrived and started a fight with Kabir, which ended when Simar killed Nikhil with her gun. They buried the body in the snow but on the way back, Kabir blamed Simar for the murder and declared that they should go to the police. In the ensuing argument, Kabir lost control of the car, which resulted in the accident that changed everything.

In the present, Kabir is angered that his identity has been robbed by Simar, who took advantage of his amnesia and ordered plastic surgeons to reconstruct his face like Nikhil's. He and Chamanlal decide to bring Nikhil's body to the police but are stopped when Simar shoots Chamanlal. She still wants Kabir to accept Nikhil's identity so they can be together but Kabir refuses. Simar tries to kill them both so they can be together in death; Kabir escapes but Simar does not.

The final scene is of Kabir arriving at the police station, carrying Nikhil's corpse with him. The end credits begin over footage of Kabir explaining his story to the officers.

Cast
 Arjun Rampal as Nikhil Oberoi / Kabir Malhotra (after Plastic Surgery)
 Priyanka Chopra as Simar Oberoi
 Ankur Nayyar  as Siddharth Thakur
 Kim Sharma as Tanya Thakur
 Sudhanshu Pandey as Kabir Malhotra (voice-over by Arjun Rampal)
 Saurabh Shukla as Chamanlal
 Anang Desai as Dr. Kapadia

Soundtrack

The music is composed by Himesh Reshammiya and the lyrics are penned by Sameer. The album has eight tracks, including one instrumental and two reprise tracks.

Track listing

References

External links
 

2005 films
2000s Hindi-language films
2000s romantic thriller films
2000s mystery thriller films
Films scored by Himesh Reshammiya
Indian romantic thriller films
Indian mystery thriller films
Indian remakes of American films